Anders Peter Nielsen (25 May 1867 – 16 April 1950) was a Danish sport shooter who competed in the late 19th century and early 20th century in rifle shooting. He participated in Shooting at the 1900 Summer Olympics in Paris and won three silver medals in the military rifle in the kneeling, prone, and 3 positions categories.

Twenty years later he won the gold medal as part of the Danish shooting team in the 300 m military rifle, standing team competition.

References

External links
 
dataOlympics profile

1867 births
1950 deaths
Danish male sport shooters
ISSF rifle shooters
Olympic shooters of Denmark
Shooters at the 1900 Summer Olympics
Shooters at the 1912 Summer Olympics
Shooters at the 1920 Summer Olympics
Shooters at the 1924 Summer Olympics
Olympic gold medalists for Denmark
Olympic silver medalists for Denmark
Place of birth missing
Olympic medalists in shooting
Medalists at the 1900 Summer Olympics
Medalists at the 1920 Summer Olympics
Sportspeople from Aarhus